Kenneth John Falconer FRSE (born 25 January 1952) is an English mathematician working in mathematical analysis and in particular on fractal geometry. He is Regius Professor of Mathematics in the School of Mathematics and Statistics at the University of St Andrews.

Research
Falconer is known for his work on the mathematics of fractals and in particular sets and measures arising from iterated function systems, especially self-similar and self-affine sets. Closely related is his research on Hausdorff and other fractal dimensions. He formulated Falconer's conjecture on the dimension of distance sets and conceived the notion of a digital sundial. In combinatorial geometry he established a lower bound of 5 for the chromatic number of the plane in the Lebesgue measurable case.

Education and career
Falconer was educated at Kingston Grammar School, Kingston upon Thames and Corpus Christi College, Cambridge. He graduated in 1974 and completed his PhD in 1979 under the supervision of Hallard Croft.

He was a research fellow at Corpus Christi College, Cambridge from 1977 to 1980 before moving to Bristol University. He was appointed Professor of Pure Mathematics at the University of St Andrews in 1993 and was head of the School of Mathematics and Statistics from 2001 to 2004. He served on the council of the London Mathematical Society from 2000 to 2009 including as publications secretary from 2006 to 2009.

Recognition
Falconer was elected a Fellow of the Royal Society of Edinburgh in 1998.

In 2020 he was awarded the Shephard Prize of the London Mathematical Society.

Personal life
Falconer was born 25 January 1952 at Bearsted Memorial Maternity Hospital outside Hampton Court Palace. 

His recreational interests include long-distance walking and hill walking. He was chair of the Long Distance Walkers Association from 2000 to 2003 and editor of their journal Strider from 1987 to 1992 and 2007–12. In 2021 he was appointed a Vice President of the LDWA. He has twice climbed all the Munros as well as all the Corbetts.

References

Selected publications

External links 
 Personal web page
 

1952 births
Living people
20th-century British mathematicians
21st-century British mathematicians
Fellows of Corpus Christi College, Cambridge
Alumni of Corpus Christi College, Cambridge
Fellows of the Royal Society of Edinburgh
Academics of the University of St Andrews
People educated at Kingston Grammar School
British geometers
Functional analysts